Michael Donald Johnson (April 7, 1944 – July 30, 2022) was an American Republican politician and businessman from the U.S. state of Oklahoma who served in the Oklahoma State Senate from district 22 from 1998 until he was term limited in 2010. Prior to his state politics career, Johnson also was active in local politics in Edmond, Oklahoma in the late 1970's, serving as the city treasurer from 1977 to 1981. In the 1980's he returned to Kingfisher, Oklahoma where he served on the local school board between 1985 and 1995 and operated his family's Chrysler dealership. He retired from politics in 2010.

Early life and career
Johnson was born in Oklahoma City on April 7, 1944. He was raised in Kingfisher, Oklahoma. His family owned a local Chrysler dealership in Kingfisher and he worked summers at a firework stand in the dealerships parking lot as a teenager. He graduated from Kingfisher High School in 1962. He met his wife, Judy, while studying at Oklahoma State University in the 1960s and they married in 1966. The same year Johnson graduated with a degree in accounting. After graduating college, the couple ran a tropical fish store in Oklahoma City and a certified public accountant firm in Edmond, Oklahoma.

Political career
In the 1970's Johnson was elected city treasurer of Edmond and served between 1977 and 1981. In 1981, Johnson and his family moved back to Kingfisher and began working for his family's car dealership. Johnson also served on the Kingfisher Public Schools school board between 1985 and 1995.

Johnson began his first term in the State Senate in 1999 and served until 2010 when he retired due to term limits. While in office he served as the first Republican chairman of the Senate appropriations committee from 2009 to 2010. In 2007 and 2008, Johnson also served as the co-chair of the Senate appropriations committee with Democratic Senator Johnnie Crutchfield.

Personal life
Johnson died due to complication from a hip surgery on July 30, 2022, at the age of 78.

References

1944 births
2022 deaths
20th-century American politicians
21st-century American politicians
American businesspeople in retailing
Businesspeople from Oklahoma City
Republican Party Oklahoma state senators
People from Kingfisher, Oklahoma
Politicians from Oklahoma City
School board members in Oklahoma